Bhadaas is a 2013 Hindi thriller film directed and produced by Ajay Yadav. The film released on 27 December 2013. The film features Meera, Aryeman Ramsay, Shree Rajput and Anant Mahadevan as main characters.

Story

The story of the movie revolves around three principal characters: a young girl called Daisy, Police inspector Vijay and Assistant Commissioner's daughter Neha. The plot of the story theme develops with the sudden disappearance of men every full-moon night, leaving in its wake panic and terror. The mystery in the whodunit deepens as the cops set a trap to nab the perpetrator. Although slated for release on 24 May 2013, Director Ajay Yadav announces its theatre premiere for 28 June 2013.

Cast

Meera Naveed
Ashutosh Kaushik
Aryeman Ramsay
Shree Rajput
Anant Mahadevan
Rudra Kaushik
Mushtaq Khan
Shiva Rindan
Gargi Patel

Soundtrack

References

External links
Bhadaas 2013 at Times Of India.

2010s Hindi-language films
2010s romantic thriller films
2013 films
Indian romantic thriller films